Spheroidene monooxygenase (CrtA, acyclic carotenoid 2-ketolase, spirilloxantin monooxygenase, 2-oxo-spirilloxanthin monooxygenase) is an enzyme with systematic name spheroidene, reduced-ferredoxin:oxygen oxidoreductase (spheroiden-2-one-forming). This enzyme catalyses the following chemical reaction

 spheroidene + reduced ferredoxin + O2  spheroiden-2-one + oxidized ferredoxin + H2O
 spirilloxantin + reduced ferredoxin + O2  2-oxospirilloxanthin + oxidized ferredoxin + H2O 
 2'-oxospirilloxanthin + reduced ferredoxin + O2  2,2'-dioxospirilloxanthin + oxidized ferredoxin + H2O

The enzyme is involved in spheroidenone biosynthesis and in 2,2'-dioxospirilloxanthin biosynthesis.

References

External links 
 

EC 1.14.15